An election was held on November 8, 2016 to elect all 99 members to Wisconsin's State Assembly. The election coincided with elections for other offices, including U.S. President, U.S. Senate, U.S. House of Representatives and State Senate. The primary election was held on August 9, 2016.

Republicans consolidated their control of the Assembly by gaining one seat, winning 64 seats compared to 36 seats for the Democrats.

Results

Statewide
Statewide results of the 2016 Wisconsin State Assembly election:

District
Results of the 2016 Wisconsin State Assembly election by district:

References

Wisconsin State Assembly
State Assembly
2016